The Carson Desert is a desert in the Lahontan Basin and the desert valley of Churchill County, Nevada (U.S.), which receives an average  annual precipitation.  The desert is the low valley area (including the Carson Sink in the north of the valley) between the adjacent mountain ranges, while the larger watershed includes the interior slopes of the demarcating ranges.  The desert was inundated by Lake Lahontan during the Pleistocene, and the watershed became part of Nevada's Conservation Security Program in 2005.

References

Great Basin deserts
Watersheds of the United States
Valleys of Nevada
Landforms of Churchill County, Nevada